The Theban Tomb TT170 is located in Sheikh Abd el-Qurna, part of the Theban Necropolis, on the west bank of the Nile, opposite to Luxor. It is the burial place of the ancient Egyptian Nebmehyt, who was a scribe of recruits of the Ramesseum in the Estate of Amun during the reign of Ramesses II in the Nineteenth Dynasty.

See also
 List of Theban tombs

References

Theban tombs
Nineteenth Dynasty of Egypt